Hurmudar, also rendered as Hormudar, may refer to:
 Hurmudar, Isin
 Hurmudar-e Bala
 Hurmudar-e Pain